Joe Hosteen Kellwood (August 20, 1921 – September 5, 2016) was a United States Marine, best known for serving as a Navajo code talker during World War II.

Born in Steamboat Canyon, Arizona, on the Navajo Reservation, Kellwood was a carpenter. He served in the First Marine Division and served in the Pacific front, seeing battle in Cape Gloucester, Peleliu and Okinawa. He received the Congressional Silver Medal for his service. Kellwood died at the veterans hospital in Phoenix, Arizona.

References 

1921 births
2016 deaths
Navajo code talkers
United States Marine Corps personnel of World War II
People from Apache County, Arizona
Military personnel from Arizona
American carpenters
20th-century Native Americans
21st-century Native Americans